The Ayusan–Paoa Bridge is a Spanish colonial era bridge in Vigan, Philippines.

The Ayusan–Paoa Bridge is estimated to be constructed around 1842. It is made of mud bricks, and a mixture of lime and eggs. The Department of Public Works and Highways (DPWH) proposed the demolition of the bridge in 2015 and the construction of a new bridge in lieu of it. Such plan was opposed by various local groups and the proposed bridge was built beside the old bridge instead. It is recognized as a National Cultural Treasure in 2016.

References

Bridges in the Philippines
Buildings and structures in Vigan
Spanish Colonial architecture in the Philippines
Bridges completed in 1842
National Cultural Treasures of the Philippines